The IBM System/390 is a discontinued mainframe product family implementing the ESA/390, the fifth generation of the System/360 instruction set architecture. The first computers to use the ESA/390 were the Enterprise System/9000 (ES/9000) family, which were introduced in 1990. These were followed by the 9672, Multiprise, and Integrated Server families of System/390 in 1994–1999, using CMOS microprocessors. The ESA/390 succeeded the ESA/370 used in the Enhanced 3090 and 4381 "E" models, and the System/370 architecture last used in the IBM 9370 low-end mainframe. The ESA/390 was succeeded by the 64-bit z/Architecture in 2000.

History
On February 15, 1988, IBM announced
Enterprise Systems Architecture/370 (ESA/370) for 3090 enhanced ("E") models and for 4381 model groups 91E and 92E.  In additional to the primary and secondary addressing modes that System/370 Extended Architecture (S/370-XA) supports, ESA has an access register mode in which each use of general register 1-15 as a base register uses an associated access register to select an address space. In addition to the normal address spaces that XA supports, ESA also allows data spaces, which contain no executable code.

On September 5, 1990, IBM published a group of hardware and software announcements, two of which included overviews of three announcements:
 System/390 (S/390), as in 360 for 1960s, 370 for 1970s.
 Enterprise System/9000 (ES/9000), as in 360 for 1960s, 370 for 1970s.
 Enterprise Systems Architecture/390 (ESA/390) was IBM's last 31-bit-address/32-bit-data mainframe computing design, copied by Amdahl, Hitachi, and Fujitsu among other competitors. It was the successor of ESA/370 and, in turn, was succeeded by the 64-bit z/Architecture in 2000. Among other things, ESA/390 added fiber optics channels, known as Enterprise Systems Connection (ESCON) channels, to the parallel (Bus and Tag) channels of ESA/370.

Despite the fact that IBM mentioned the 9000 family first in some of the day's announcements, it was clear "by the end of the day" that it was "for System/390," although it was a shortened name, S/390, that was placed on some of the actual "boxes" later shipped.

The ES/9000 include rack-mounted models, free standing air cooled models and water cooled models. The low end models were substantially less expensive than the 3090 or 4381 previously needed to run MVS/ESA, and could also run VM/ESA and VSE/ESA, which IBM announced at the same time.

IBM periodically added named features to ESA/390 in conjunction with new processors; the ESA/390 Principles of Operation manual identifies them only by name, not by the processors supporting them.

Machines supporting the architecture were sold under the brand System/390 (S/390) from September 1990. The 9672 implementations of System/390 were the first high-end IBM mainframe architecture implemented first with CMOS CPU electronics rather than the traditional bipolar logic.

The IBM z13 was the last z Systems server to support running an operating system in ESA/390 architecture mode. However, all 24-bit and 31-bit problem-state application programs originally written to run on the ESA/390 architecture readily run unaffected by this change.

ESA/390 architecture

The architecture (the Linux kernel architecture designation is "s390"; "s390x" designates the 64-bit z/Architecture) employs a channel I/O subsystem in the System/370 Extended Architecture (S/370-XA) tradition, offloading almost all I/O activity to specialized hardware more sophisticated than the S/360 and S/370 I/O channels. It also includes a standard set of CCW opcodes that new equipment is expected to support.

The architecture maintains problem state backward compatibility back to 1964 with the 24-bit-address/32-bit-data (System/360 and System/370) and subsequent 24/31-bit-address/32-bit-data architectures (System/370-XA and ESA/370). However, the I/O subsystem is based on System/370 Extended Architecture (S/370-XA), not on the original S/370 I/O instructions.

ESA/390 is essentially a 32-bit architecture; as with System/360, System/370, 370-XA, and ESA/370, the general-purpose registers are 32 bits long, and the arithmetic instructions support 32-bit arithmetic. Only byte-addressable real memory (Central Storage) and Virtual Storage addressing is limited to 31 bits. (IBM reserved the most significant bit to easily support applications expecting 24-bit addressing, as well as to sidestep a problem with extending two instructions to handle 32-bit unsigned addresses.)

In fact, total system memory is not limited to 31 bits (2 GB). While the virtual storage of a single address space cannot exceed 2 GB, ESA/390 supports multiple concurrent 2 GB address spaces. Further, each address space can have Dataspaces associated with it, each of which can have up to 2 GB of Virtual Storage. In the ES/9000 the Central Storage is limited to 2 GB, but additional memory can be configured as expanded storage. With Expanded Storage 4 KB pages can be moved between Central Storage and Expanded Storage. Expanded Storage can be used for ultra-fast paging, for disk caching, and for virtual disks within the VM/CMS operating system. Under Linux/390 this memory cannot be used for disk caching; instead, it is supported by a block device driver, allowing to use it as ultra-fast swap space and for RAM drives.

In addition, a machine may be divided into Logical Partitions (LPARs), each with its own virtual system memory so that multiple operating systems may run concurrently on one machine.

An important capability to form a Parallel Sysplex was added to the architecture in 1994.

Some PC-based IBM-compatible mainframes which provide ESA/390 processors in smaller machines have been released over time, but are only intended for software development.

The Hercules emulator is a portable ESA/390 and z/Architecture machine emulator which supports enough devices to boot many ESA/390 operating systems. Since it is written in pure C, it has been ported to many platforms, including S/390 itself. A commercial emulation product for IBM xSeries with higher execution speed is also available.

Common I/O Device Commands
2.0 Chapter 2. Specific I/O-Device Commands in Enterprise Systems Architecture/390 Common I/O-Device Commands shows the following commands.

S/390 computers

ES/9000
Eighteen models were announced September 5, 1990 for the ES/9000 in three form factors; the water-cooled 9021 to succeed the IBM 3090, and the air-cooled standalone 9121 and rack-mounted 9221 to succeed the IBM 4381 and 9370 respectively. The largest announced model had a 100-fold performance over the smallest model, and the clock frequency ranged from 67-111 MHz (15-9 ns) in the 9021 and 67 MHz in the 9121 to 26-33 MHz (38-30 ns) in the 9221. The 9221 models 120, 130 and 150 were initially available only with the "System/370 Base Option"; the "ESA Option" shipped in July 1991. The 9221 processors were made of VLSI CMOS chips designed in Böblingen, Germany, whence the 9672 line later originated.

The lower 6 of the 8 water-cooled models (codenamed H0) were immediately available, but used the same processor as the 3090-J, still at the 69 MHz (14.5 ns) maximum frequency and thus with unchanged performance. Those models' main difference from the 3090-J was the optional addition of ESCON, Sysplex and Integrated Cryptographic Feature. Only the models 900 and 820 had an all-new design (codenamed H2), featuring private split I+D 128+128 KB L1 caches and a shared 4 MB L2 cache (2 MB per side) with 11-cycle latency, more direct interconnects between the processors, multi-level TLBs, branch target buffer and 111 MHz (9 ns) clock frequency. These were the first models with out-of-order execution since the System/370-195 of 1973. However unlike the old S/360-91-derived systems, the models 900 and 820 had full out-of-order execution for both integer and floating-point units, with precise exception handling, and a fully superscalar pipeline. Models 820 and 900 shipped to customers in September 1991, a year later than the models with older technology. Later these new technologies were used in models 520, 640, 660, 740 and 860.

All three lines got additions and upgrades until 1993–1994. In February 1993 an 8-processor 141 MHz (7.1 ns) model 982 became available, with models 972, 962, 952, 942, 941, 831, 822, 821 and 711 following in March. These models, codenamed H5, had double the L2 cache and 30% higher per-processor performance than the H2 line, and added a hardware data compression. The compression was also included in the new, 50% faster models of the 9121. In April 1994, alongside the CMOS-based new 9672 series and improved 9221 models, IBM announced also their ultimate bipolar model, the 10-processor model 9X2 rated at 468 MIPS, to become available in October.

Models

ES/9000 features
 ESCON fiber optic channels
 Sysplex for synchronizing the systems to ease management
 Vector Facility: up to one vector processor per Central Processor available on the 9021 and 9121. First used on the 3090 to replace the IBM 3838 array processor announced in 1976 for System/370.
 Up to one Integrated Cryptographic Feature (ICRF) per side was available on the 9021 for accelerating encryption, succeeding the 3848 Cryptographic Unit.
 (Each Central Processor accommodates one coprocessor at a time; the combined number of installed Vector Facilities and ICRFs cannot exceed the number of Central Processors.)
 The new models of the 9021 and 9121 from 1993 feature data compression hardware.

Logical partitioning

Previously available only on IBM 3090, Logical Partitions (LPARs) are a standard feature of the ES/9000 processors whereby IBM's Processor Resource/Systems Manager (PR/SM) hypervisor allows different operating systems to run concurrently in separate logical partitions (LPARs), with a high degree of isolation. Initially 7 partitions per a disconnected side were supported. In December 1992 the LPAR capacity of the H2 (520-based) models was increased to 10 per a disconnected side. For example, a two-processor model 660 could now support up to 20 partitions instead of 14, if the two sides (each with one processor) are electrically isolated.

This was introduced as part of IBM's moving towards "lights-out" operation and increased control of multiple system configurations.

9672 

Launched in 1994 first as the "Parallel Transaction Server" (alongside the 9673 "Parallel Query Server"), subsumed by the "Parallel Enterprise Server" launched later in the year, the six generations of the IBM 9672 machines transitioned IBM's mainframes fully to CMOS microprocessors, as by a strategic decision no more ES/9000 (bipolar-based except the 9221) models would be released after 1994. The initial generations of 9672 were slower than the largest ES/9000 sold in parallel, but the fifth and sixth generations were the most powerful and capable ESA/390 machines built by IBM.

In the course of the generations, CPUs added more instructions and increased performance. The first three generations (G1 to G3) focused on low cost. The 4th generation was aimed at matching the performance of the last bipolar model, the 9021-9X2. It was decided to be accomplished by pursuing high clock frequencies. The G4 could reach 70% higher frequency than the G3 at silicon process parity, but it suffered a 23% IPC reduction from the G3. The initial G4-based models became available in June 1997, but it wasn't until the 370 MHz model RY5 (with a "Modular Cooling Unit") became available at the end of the year that a 9672 would almost match the 141 MHz model 9X2's performance. At 370 MHz it was the second-highest clocked microprocessor at the time, after the Alpha 21164 of DEC. The execution units in each G4 processor are duplicated for the purpose of error detection and correction. Arriving in late September 1998, the G5 more than doubled the performance over any previous IBM mainframe, and restored IBM's performance lead that had been lost to Hitachi's Skyline mainframes in 1995. The G5 operated at up to 500MHz, again second only to the DEC Alphas into early 1999. The G5 also added support for the IEEE 754 floating-point formats. The thousandth G5 system shipped less than 100 days after the manufacturing began; the greatest ramping of production in S/390's history. In late May 1999 the G6 arrived featuring copper interconnects, raising the frequency to 637MHz, higher than the fastest DEC machines at the time.

Other
In September 1996 IBM launched the S/390 Multiprise 2000, positioned below the 9672. It used the same technology as the 9672 G3, but it fit half as many processors (up to five) and its off-chip caches were smaller. The 9672 G3 and the Multiprise 2000 were the last versions to support pre-XA System/370 mode. In October 1997 models of Multiprise 2000 with an 11% higher performance were launched. The Multiprise 3000, based on the 9672 G5, became available in September 1999, featuring PCI buses.

The S/390 Integrated Server, an even lower-end S/390 system than Multiprise, shipped by the end of 1998. It emerged from a line of S/390-compatibility/coprocessor cards for PCs, but is a true S/390 system capable of server duties, having relegated the Pentium II to the role of an I/O coprocessor. It was the first S/390 server to support PCI. It had the same performance and 256 MB maximum memory capacity as the 7 years older low-end 9221 model 170.

From 1997 IBM also offered a "S/390 Application StarterPak", intended as a devkit for developing and testing mainframe software.

See also
 IBM System/360
 IBM System/370
 IBM 30XX mainframe lines
 IBM 303X
 IBM 308X
 IBM 3090
 IBM Z

Notes

References

External links

 IBM
 IBM Z mainframe homepage
 Current IBM Z mainframe servers
 
 IBM System/390 Photo
 
 
  Multiple links and references.
  Exterior and interior images of the IBM 390.
 

Computing platforms
9000
32-bit computers